Padandestan (also Romanized as Padandestān, Padandastan, and Pedandestān; also known as Bulandistān, Pandandestān, and Pandestān) is a village in Kuhestan Rural District, in the Central District of Nain County, Isfahan Province, Iran. At the 2006 census, its population was 14, in 8 families.

References 

Populated places in Nain County